The 1961 Oklahoma Sooners football team represented the University of Oklahoma during the 1961 NCAA University Division football season. They played their home games at Oklahoma Memorial Stadium and competed as members of the Big Eight Conference. They were coached by head coach Bud Wilkinson.

Schedule

References

Oklahoma
Oklahoma Sooners football seasons
Oklahoma Sooners football